Burton, Burtons, or Burton's may refer to:

Companies 
 Burton (retailer), a clothing retailer
Burton's, Abergavenny, a shop built for the company in 1937
The Montague Burton Building, Dublin a shop built for the company between 1929 and 1930
Burton Brewery Company
Burton Snowboards
Burton's Biscuit Company

People 
Burton (name) (includes list of people with the name)

Places

Australia 
 Burton, Queensland
 Burton, South Australia

Canada 
 Burton, British Columbia
 Burton, New Brunswick
 Burton Parish, New Brunswick
 Burton, Prince Edward Island
 Burtons, Nova Scotia

United Kingdom

England 
 Burton (near Neston), on the Wirral Peninsula, Cheshire
 Burton (near Tarporley), in the area of Cheshire West and Chester, Cheshire
 Burton-in-Kendal, Cumbria
 Burton, Dorset
 Burton on the Wolds, Leicestershire
 Burton, Lincolnshire
 Burton-upon-Stather, North Lincolnshire
 Burton in Lonsdale, North Yorkshire
 Burton-on-Yore, North Yorkshire
 Burton, Northumberland
 Burton upon Trent, East Staffordshire, including:
Burton (UK Parliament constituency)
Burton, Staffordshire (civil parish)
 Burton Pynsent, Somerset
 Burton, Nettleton, Wiltshire
 Burton, Mere, Wiltshire, in Mere parish

Wales 
 Burton, Pembrokeshire
 Burton (Pembrokeshire electoral ward)
 Burton, Wrexham

United States 
 Burton, Arizona
 Burton, Georgia
 Burton, Idaho
 Burton, Illinois
 Burton, Kentucky
 Burton, Michigan
 Burton, Missouri
 Burton, Nebraska
 Burton, Ohio
 Burton, South Carolina
 Burton, Texas
 Burton, Washington
 Burton, West Virginia
 Burton, Wisconsin
 Burton City, Ohio
 Burton, an unincorporated community of Owosso Township, Michigan

Transportation 
 Burton (car)
 Burton (steamboat)
 , renamed Exmoor, a Royal Navy destroyer

Other uses 
 Burton (crater) on Mars
 Burton (nut)
 Burton Albion F.C., an English football club
 Burton RFC, an English rugby union team
 Burton v. Florida, 2010
 Burton v. United States, 1905/6
 Burton's Gentleman's Magazine, U.S., 1837–1840
 Burton's gerbil, Gerbillus burtoni

See also 
 
 
Bourton (disambiguation)
 Bruton (disambiguation)
 Burdon (disambiguation)
 Butrón (disambiguation)
 Lake Burton (disambiguation)
 Burton Township (disambiguation)